Uttar Pradesh Sametata Khud ko Itihaas ke Pannon Mein (Uttar Pradesh Covers Itself in the Pages of History) is the song of the state of Uttar Pradesh, India, which was adopted in 2022 as part of the "Azadi Ka Amrit Mahotsav" initiative to celebrate the 75th anniversary of Indian independence.

Lyrics

See also
List of Indian state songs
Emblem of Uttar Pradesh

References

External links
State Song of Uttar Pradesh

Indian state songs
Symbols of Uttar Pradesh